Oumar Kalabane (born 8 April 1981) is a Guinean former professional footballer who played as a defender. He represented the Guinea national team between 2000 and 2013.

Club career
Born in Conakry, Kalabane started his career with Hirondelles de Conakry in his native Guinea, before moving to Étoile de Guinée and then Étoile Sahel of Tunisia in 2000. After five years there, Kalabane was signed by AJ Auxerre of Ligue 1 where he spent two seasons, appearing in 20 league matches.

He also played three seasons in the Turkish Süper Lig with Manisaspor.

On 19 July 2012, Gabala FC announced the signing of Kalabane on a two-year contract. He made his debut for Gabala on 4 August 2012 in a 1–1 draw against Simurq. He scored his first and second goals for Gabala in their 4–1 home victory over Sumgayit on 25 August 2012. At the end of his first season Kalabane had played 29 games in all competitions, scoring two goals.

After playing only three of the first 14 games of the 2013–14 season, Kalabane suffered a meniscus tear at his knee during training and underwent surgery at Acibadem Fulya Hospital. Kalabane was told he could leave Gabala in December 2013.

International career
At the international level, Kalabane has made several appearances for the full Guinea national football team, including 10 qualifying matches for various FIFA World Cups. Kalabane played in four matches at the 2006 Africa Cup of Nations and four matches at the 2008 Africa Cup of Nations, where he scored a goal in the opening match, a 2–1 defeat to Ghana.

Career statistics

Club

International

Scores and results list Guinea's goal tally first, score column indicates score after each Kalabane goal.

References

External links

1981 births
Living people
Association football defenders
Guinean footballers
Guinean expatriate footballers
Guinea international footballers
2006 Africa Cup of Nations players
2008 Africa Cup of Nations players
2012 Africa Cup of Nations players
Étoile Sportive du Sahel players
AJ Auxerre players
Manisaspor footballers
Al Dhafra FC players
Gabala FC players
Tunisian Ligue Professionnelle 1 players
Ligue 1 players
Süper Lig players
TFF First League players
UAE Pro League players
Azerbaijan Premier League players
Expatriate footballers in Turkey
Expatriate footballers in France
Expatriate footballers in Israel
Guinean expatriate sportspeople in Tunisia
Guinean expatriate sportspeople in France
Guinean expatriate sportspeople in Turkey
Expatriate footballers in Azerbaijan